This is a list of the tallest buildings in Iran.Note that the Milad Tower (at 435 m (1,427 ft) the 6th tallest concrete tower in the world) is not listed here because it is an observation/telecommunications tower.

Buildings over 100 meters in Iran:

See also
List of tallest buildings in Tehran

References

Tallest
Iran